Images is the third album by the American pop group The Walker Brothers. Released in 1967 the album reached number six on the UK Albums Chart. It was the last of their trio of 1960s albums. They would not record together again until 1975's No Regrets.

The group's musical accompaniment was directed by Reg Guest and produced by John Franz. Receiving good to mixed reviews, the album was first released in both Mono and Stereo LP formats in March 1967. The album was later released on CD having been remastered and expanded in 1998. The sleeve notes were written by Alan Freeman.

Reception
Images received good to mixed reviews from the majority of critics.

Legacy
Richie Unterberger, writing retrospectively for AllMusic, called the album "as wildly uneven as their other pair. Affecting pop/rock ballads and operatic crooner vehicles were interspersed with absolutely inappropriate up-tempo blue-eyed soul (always a weak point for the group) and rock covers". Unterberger rates Scott Walker's songs highly, noting that they "[exhibit] a growth that foreshadowed some of the more ambitious aspects of his early solo albums". He also described John Walker's "I Can't Let It Happen to You" as "one of The Walker Brothers' best songs, and undoubtedly the best thing John Walker contributed to their records".

Track listing

Personnel
The Walker Brothers
Gary Walker - drums, vocals
John Walker - guitar, vocals
Scott Walker - vocals, guitar, keyboards
with:
Reg Guest - accompaniment

Charts

References

1967 albums
The Walker Brothers albums
Philips Records albums
Albums produced by Johnny Franz